Passages is a 2023 French romance drama film directed by Ira Sachs starring Franz Rogowski, Ben Whishaw, and Adèle Exarchopoulos. It depicts a long-time male couple one of whom has an affair with a woman. It had its world premiere at the 2023 Sundance Film Festival.

Cast
 Franz Rogowski as Tomas
 Ben Whishaw as Martin
 Adèle Exarchopoulos as Agathe
 Erwan Kepoa Falé as Ahmad
 Olivier Rabourdin
 Caroline Chaniolleau

Production
Filming began on 15 November 2021 in Paris.

Release
The film premiered at the Sundance Film Festival on 23 January 2023. Shortly after, Mubi acquired distribution rights to the film in the United States, United Kingdom, Ireland, and Latin America. It is set to screen in the Panorama section at the 73rd Berlin International Film Festival in February 2023.

Reception 
On review aggregator website Rotten Tomatoes, the film has an approval rating of 92% based on 39 reviews, with an average rating of 7.8/10. On Metacritic, the film has a weighted average of 81 out of 100 based on 15 critic reviews, indicating "universal acclaim".

References

External links
 

2023 films
2023 independent films
2023 romantic drama films
2023 LGBT-related films
French romantic drama films
LGBT-related romantic drama films
Male bisexuality in film
Films about infidelity
Films set in Paris
Films shot in Paris
French LGBT-related films
2020s French films
2020s English-language films
2020s French-language films